Manolo Vicera (born 15 February 1950) is a Filipino boxer. He competed in the men's light flyweight event at the 1968 Summer Olympics.

References

External links
 

1950 births
Living people
Filipino male boxers
Olympic boxers of the Philippines
Boxers at the 1968 Summer Olympics
Sportspeople from Manila
Asian Games medalists in boxing
Boxers at the 1970 Asian Games
Asian Games silver medalists for the Philippines
Medalists at the 1970 Asian Games
Light-flyweight boxers